The Cicaré CH-7 and Heli-Sport CH7 are a series of ultralight, kit-built helicopters based on a single-seat Argentinian design from the late 1980s. It was later developed into a tandem two-seater, and remains in production.

Design and development
In 1989 EliSport, which became Heli-Sport in 1997, bought the rights to the Cicare CH-6, a small single-seat open cockpit helicopter designed in Argentina by Augusto Cicaré. It was developed by Josi and Claudio Barbero and, with the help of the sports car designer, Marcello Gandini who produced a new, enclosed cabin, marketed from 1992 as the CH-7 Angel.  Its commercial success led to a tandem two-seat version with a stretched cabin and bigger engine, named the CH-7 Kompress and, in 2005, a further refinement designated the CH-7 Kompress Charlie.

The piston engine-powered CH-7 ultralight series use the traditional "penny-farthing" layout with two-bladed main and tail rotors.  The main rotor is formed from composites and is a teetering, semi-rigid design with 6° of twist.  The tail rotor is aluminium. The pod-and-boom fuselage has a fiberglass cabin built on a steel tube frame, with a long transparent forward-opening canopy.  The steel frame also carries the engine, semi-exposed behind the accommodation and connected to the main rotor shaft by a belt drive.  A slender aluminium boom, strengthened by a pair of long struts to the lower fuselage frame, carries both the tail rotor and swept fins.  The upper fin is topped with a short horizontal tailplane, with small endplate fins, and the lower one ends with a tailskid.  The CH-7 uses a simple aluminium skid undercarriage, which may be fitted with small wheels for ground handling or multi-tube inflatable floats for flying off water.  In this last form the CH-7 is called the Mariner. The Kompress Charlie has faired, wide-chord carbon fibre skid legs.

The Kompress and Kompress Charlie are sold in kit form for home assembly, the manufacturers quoting a 200-hour building time.  A fast-build kit, with more components pre-assembled, is claimed to require 85 hours.

The Kompress series may be fitted with a hook for lifting loads of up to 100 kg (220 lb), or fitted with spray bars for agricultural work.

Operational history
120 Angels were built between 1992 and 1997, followed by 215 Kompress and Kompress Charlies up to May 2009.  By mid-2009 the Kompress variants had logged over 30,000 flying hours with owners in 15 countries.  There are dealerships in the Czech republic, France, Italy and Poland.

In 2007 the CH-7 won the Italian Helicopter Championships.  It gained 3rd place in the 2009 World Air Games.

Variants
Information from Jane's All the World's Aircraft 2010 and manufacturer's website
CH-7 AngelCH-6 with new, enclosed cockpit, powered by either 48 kW (64 hp) Rotax 582UL UL or 60 kW (80 hp) Rotax 912 UL. First marketed in 1992, but kits no longer (2010) available.

CH-7 Kompress Tandem two-seat version, with elongated cockpit and 114 hp (85 kW) Rotax 914 engine.  Still available, upgradable to Kompress Charlie standard.

CH-7 Kompress Charlie 2005 development of Kompress with greater fuel capacity, hinged carbon fibre engine cowlings and carbon fibre, airfoil section undercarriage legs.  Vibration reduced and speed and high altitude performance improved.

CH-7 Mariner Inflatable float-equipped version, 15 kg (33 lb) heavier.

CH-7B Spirit
Evolutionary design version, powered by a four cylinder, air and liquid-cooled, four-stroke, dual-ignition  Rotax 912S engine. In production 2011 by Cicaré SA of Argentina.

CH-7T Spirit Tandem
Version, powered by a four cylinder, air and liquid-cooled, four-stroke, dual-ignition  Rotax 914 engine. In production as a 51% kit  and as a ready-to-fly aircraft in 2015 by Cicaré SA of Argentina.

Specifications (Kompress Charlie, European specification)

See also

References
Notes

External links

 

CH-7
Homebuilt aircraft
1980s Italian helicopters
1990s Italian sport aircraft
Single-engined piston helicopters